Aankalai Nambathey is a 1987 Indian Tamil-language comedy drama film directed by K. Alex Pandian, starring Pandiyan, Rekha, and Ramya Krishnan. The film was released on 27 June 1987, and played for 50 days in theatres.

Plot

Cast 
Pandiyan
Rekha
Ramya Krishnan
Senthil
Charle
Shankar

Production 
Aankalai Nambathey is the directorial debut of K. Alex Pandian.

Soundtrack 
Soundtrack was composed by Devendran.

Reception 
The Indian Express wrote, "Routine song-and-dance sequences riddle the film". Jeyamanmadhan of Kalki wrote that if the film had been given an agility injection and fed a speed pill during the climax, then there would have been a sense of completion upon leaving the theatre.

References

External links 
 

1980s Tamil-language films
1987 comedy-drama films
1987 directorial debut films
1987 films
Films scored by Devendran
Indian comedy-drama films